VMAX, Vmax or Vmax may refer to:

Vmax (maximum voltage/velocity)
 Vmax, the maximum voltage attained in the action potential.
 Vmax, maximum aortic velocity, the maximum speed of blood flow in the aorta of the heart, also less commonly noted as AoVmax 
 Maximal rate in Michaelis–Menten kinetics
 See V Speeds for aircraft speeds

VMAX, V-Max or Vmax
 Yamaha V-Max and VMAX, motorcycles 
 EMC Symmetrix, VMAX Series, a data storage product line from EMC Corporation
 Maximum Velocity (V-Max), an Italian movie
 Vmax cinemas of Village Cinemas, features larger screens and enhanced visual and audio quality